The heads of the Georgian Orthodox Church and its predecessors in the ancient Georgian Kingdom of Iberia (i.e. Kartli) have borne the title of Catholicos-Patriarch of All Georgia since 1010, except between 1811 and 1917, when the Church was subordinated to the Russian Orthodox Church as part of the Russian colonial policies. 

The current style of the head of the Georgian Orthodox Church is as follows:

Archbishops of Mtskheta (326–467)
Ioane I (326–363) 
Iakobi (363–375) 
Iobi (375–390) 
Elia I (390–400) 
Svimeon I (400–410) 
Mose (410–425) 
Iona (425–429) 
Ieremia (429–433) 
Grigol I (433–434) 
Vasili I (434–436) 
Glonakor (436–448) 
Iovel I (448–452) 
Mikael I (452–467)

Catholicoi of Iberia (467–1010) 
Petre I (467–474) 
Samoel I (474–502) 
Gabriel I (502–510) 
Tavfechag I (510–516) 
Chirmagi–Chigirmane (516–523) 
Saba I (523–532) 
Evlavi (532–544) 
Samoel II (544–553) 
Makari (553–569) 
Svimeon II (569–575) 
Samoel III (575–582) 
Samoel IV (582–591) 
Bartlome (591–595) 
Kirion I (595–610) 
Ioane II (610–619) 
Babila (619–629) 
Tabor (629–634) 
Samoel V (634–640) 
Evnon (640–649) 
Tavfechag II (649–664) 
Evlale (664–668) 
Iovel II (668–670) 
Samoel VI (670–677) 
Giorgi I (677–678) 
Kirion II (678–683) 
Izid–Bozidi (683–685) 
Teodore I (Teodose) (685–689) 
Petre (Svimeoni) II (689–720) 
Talale (720–731) 
Mamai (731–744) 
Ioane III (744–760) 
Grigol II (760–767) 
Sarmeane (767–774) 
Mikael II (774–780) 
Samoel VII (780–790) 
Kirile (791–802) 
Grigol III (802–814) 
Samoel VIII (814–826) 
Giorgi II (826–838) 
Gabriel II (838–850) 
Ilarion I (850–860) 
Arsen I (860–887) 
Evsuki (887–900) 
Klementos (900–914) 
Basili II (914–930) 
Mikael III (930–944) 
Davit I (944–955) 
Arseni II (955–980) 
Oqropiri (Ioane I) (980–1001) 
Svimeon III (1001)

Catholicos-Patriarchs of Georgia (1010–1811) 
St. Melkisedek I (1001–1030)  
Okropir (Ioane) II (1031–1039) 
Melkisedek I (1039–1045), restored 
Okropir (Ioane) II (1045–1049), restored 
Ekvtime I (1049–1055) 
Giorgi III (Taoeli) (1055–1065) 
Gabriel III (Safareli) (1065–1080) 
Dimitri (1080–1090) 
Basili III (Karichisdze) (1090–1100) 
Ioane IV (Safareli) (1100–1142) 
Svimeon IV (Gulaberisdze) (1142–1146) 
Saba II (1146–1150) 
Nikoloz I (Gulaberize) (1150–1178) 
Michael IV (1178–1186) 
Theodore II (1186–1206) 
Basil IV (1206–1208) 
John VII (1208–1210) 
Epiphane (1210–1220) 
Ekvtime II (1220–1222) 
Arseni III (1222–1225) 
Giorgi IV (1225–1230) 
Arseni IV (Bulmaisisdze) (1230–1240) 
Nikoloz II (1240–1280) 
Abraam I (1280–1310) 
Ekvtime III (1310–1325) 
Mikel V (1325–1330) 
Basil V (1330–1350) 
Doroteoz I (1350–1356) 
Shio I (1356–1364) 
Nikoloz III (1364–1380) 
Giorgi V (1380–1399) 
Elioz (Gobirakhisdze) (1399–1411) 
Mikel VI (1411–1426) 
David II (1426–1428) 
Teodore III (1428–1435) 
David III (1435–1439) 
Shio II (1439–1443/47 ) 
David IV (1443/47–1459) 
Markoz (1460–1466) 
Davit IV (1466–1479) 
Evagre (1480–1492)
Abraam II (Abalaki) (1492–1497) 
Efrem I (1497–1500) 
Evagre (1500–1503), restored 
Doroteoz II (1503–1510) 
Dionise (1510–1511) 
Doroteoz II (1511–1516), restored 
Basil VI (1517–1528) 
Malachia (1528–1538) 
Melkisedek II (Bagrationi) (1538–1541) 
Germene (1541–1547) 
Svimeon V (1547–1550) 
Zebede I (1550–1557) 
Domenti I (1557–1562) 
Nikoloz IV (Baratashvili) (1562–1584) 
St. Nikoloz V (1584–1591) 
Doriteoz III (1592–1599) 
Domenti II (1599–1603) 
Zebede II (1603–1610) 
Ioane VI (Avalishvili) (1610–1613) 
Kristefore I (1613–1622) 
Zachary (1623-1630) 
St. Evdemoz I (Diasamidze) (1630–1638) 
Kristefore II (Urdubegisdze Amilakhvari) (1638–1660) 
Domenti III (Kaikhosro Mukhran Batonisdze) (1660–1675) 
Nikoloz VI (Magaladze) (1675–1676) 
Nikoloz VII (Amilakhvari) (1676–1687) 
Ioan VII (Diasamidze) (1687–1691)
Nikoloz VII (Amilakhvari) (1691–1695), restored 
Ioan VII (Diasamidze) (1696–1700), restored 
Evdemoz II (Diasamidze) (1700–1703) 
Domenti IV (1704–1725) 
Besarion (Orbeliani) (1725–1737) 
Kirile (1737–1739) 
Domenti IV (1739–1741), restored 
Nikoloz VIII (Kherkheulidze) (1742–1744) 
Anton I (1744–1755)  
Ioseb (Jandieri) (1755–1764) 
Ioseb of Abkhazia (1769-1776)
Anton I (1764–1788), restored 
St. Anton II (1788–1811)

Exarchs of Georgia (1811–1917)
Autocephalous status abolished and administration placed under the Russian Orthodox Church, 1811–1917
 Metropolitan Barlaam (Eristavi) (1811–1817)
 Metropolitan Theophilact (Rusanov) (1817–1821)
 Metropolitan Jonah (Vasilevsky) (1821–1834)
 Archbishop Moses (Bogdanov-Platonov) (1832–1834)
 Archbishop Eugene (Baganov) (1834–1844)
 Archbishop Isidore (Nikolsky) (1844–1858)
 Archbishop Ebsebius (Ilinsky) (1858–1877)
 Archbishop Joannicius (Rudnev) (1877–1882)
 Archbishop Paul (Lebedev) (1882–1887)
 Archbishop Palladius (Raev) (1887–1892)
 Archbishop Vladimir (Bogojavlensky) (1892–1898)
 Archbishop Flavian (Gorodetsky) (1898–1901)
 Archbishop Alexis I (Opotsky) (1901–1905)
 Archbishop Nicholas (Nalimov) (1905–1906)
 Archbishop Nikon (Sofiisky) (1906–1908)
 Archbishop Innocent (Beliaev) (1909–1913)
 Archbishop Alexis II (Molchanov) (1913–1914)
 Archbishop Piterim (Oknov) (1914–1915)
 Archbishop Platon (Rozhdestvensky) (1915–1917), Primus (chairman) of the Russian Holy Synod

Catholicos-Patriarchs of All Georgia (1917–present)
St. Kirion II (1917–1918)
Leonid (1918–1921)
St. Ambrosius (1921–1927)
Christophorus III (1927–1932)
St. Callistratus (1932–1952)
Melchizedek III (1952–1960)
Ephraim II (1960–1972)
David V (1972–1977)
Ilia II (1977–present)

Sources

External links
 

Georgian Orthodox Church

Primates of the Georgian Orthodox Church
Lists of patriarchs
Georgia
Lists of popes, primates, and patriarchs
Georgian